Matteo Panunzi (Rome, 12 May 1997) is an Italian rugby union player.
His usual position is as a Scrum-Half and he currently plays for Petrarca Padova in Top12.

For 2015–16 Pro12 season, he named like Permit Player for Zebre. 

In 2016 and 2017, Panunzi was named in the Italy Under 20 squad.

References

External links 
It's Rugby France Profile
ESPN Profile
All Rugby Profile

Sportspeople from Rome
Italian rugby union players
1997 births
Living people
Rugby union scrum-halves
Petrarca Rugby players
Valorugby Emilia players
Zebre Parma players